Borderline Patrol is a four-track EP released by The Parlotones in 2004.

Track listing

Personnel
Kahn Morbee – lead vocals, rhythm guitar
Paul Hodgson – lead guitar
Glen Hodgson – bass guitar, backing vocals
Neil Pauw – drums

References 

The Parlotones albums
2004 EPs